Fore River may refer to:

 Fore River (Maine), an estuary, separating Portland and South Portland in Maine
 Fore River (Massachusetts), a.k.a. Weymouth Fore River
 Fore River Shipyard, Massachusetts
 Fore River (soccer), an amateur U.S. soccer team